The Hardest Way is an album by the American garage punk band The Original Sins. It was released in 1989 by Psonik Records.

The CD version of the album includes bonus tracks taken from the band's Australia-only extended play, Party's Over.

Critical reception
Trouser Press wrote that the album "demonstrates the Sins’ marvelous ability to synthesize an original sound — less stylized than the Lyres’ — from now-standard ingredients." The Morning Call listed The Hardest Way on their list of the top 10 albums of 1989, writing that "the Sins' second LP is an embarrassment of riches; it's fiercer, more melodic, more complex and more danceable than their debut, Big Soul." Spin wrote that "the songs fit more comfortably into standard 60s punk grooves."

Track listing
All songs written by John Terlesky

Personnel

The Original Sins
Ken Bussiere – bass guitar, backing vocals
Dave Ferrara – drums, backing vocals
Dan McKinney – organ
John Terlesky – vocals, guitar, production

Additional musicians and production
Jane Brown – illustrations
James MacMillan – engineering
Dave Stein – production
Scott Stralo – photography
Howie Weinberg – mastering

References

External links
 

1989 albums
The Original Sins albums